Turbana is a municipality in the Bolívar department in Colombia. Most of the people living here depend on agriculture and cattle raising for their main income. There is no sewer system or dump and waste is disposed of in streams and roadways. Turbana borders Turbaco and Cartagena in the north, Arjona in the south and Arjona and Turbaco in the east.

External links 
 View a boundary-overlaid version of Turbana on Google Maps

Municipalities of Bolívar Department
Populated places established in 1894
1894 establishments in Colombia